John Organ is the Canadian Anglican Bishop of the Diocese of Western Newfoundland. He was elected to serve as bishop in June 2018.

In 2019, Organ welcomed a decision of the diocesan synod to allow same-sex marriages to be solemnised in the diocese's churches, "The outcome of that was tremendous pain and suffering for LGBT folks, and for their families and friends and for their allies. It was a very difficult synod." The motion, which passed with a 94% majority, allows non-consenting clergy to opt out of solemnising same-sex weddings if this would violate their personal beliefs.

References

Living people
21st-century Anglican Church of Canada bishops
People from Newfoundland (island)
Anglican bishops of Western Newfoundland
Year of birth missing (living people)